Fatma Zohra Ouhachi-Vesely (née Ksentini) is an Algerian woman who was the first  United Nations special rapporteur on toxic wastes from 1995 to 2004. Prior to her position, she was a Special Rapporteur in the Sub-Commission on Prevention of Discrimination and Protection of Minorities from 1989 to 1994.

Career
Ksentini was part of the Sub-Commission on Prevention of Discrimination and Protection of Minorities when she was named special rapporteur on Human Rights and the Environment in 1989. For the United Nations Commission on Human Rights, she started a four-year investigation into environmental human rights in 1990. After completing her research in 1994, she submitted her findings and cosigned the Draft Declaration of Principles on Human Rights and the Environment.

In 1995, Ksentini became the United Nations Special Rapporteur on Toxic Wastes. During the beginning of her tenure, she gathered information on the health effects of disposing toxic wastes. After submitting her report in 1997, Ksentini criticized the Office of the United Nations High Commissioner for Human Rights for not providing her the necessary funding to conduct on the ground research. After being reappointed in 1998, Ksentini began developing proposals on the elimination of toxic waste disposals into developing countries. Her final term as Special Rapporteur started in 2001 and ended in 2004.

Outside of her work as Special Rapporetur, Ksentini was the chairwoman of the Working Group on Contemporary Forms of Slavery in 1991.

Personal life
Ksentini was married to a Mr. Ouhachi-Vesely.

References

United Nations special rapporteurs
20th-century Algerian women politicians
Living people
Year of birth missing (living people)
20th-century Algerian politicians
Algerian officials of the United Nations
21st-century Algerian people
21st-century Algerian women politicians
21st-century Algerian politicians